The canton of Brienon-sur-Armançon is an administrative division of the Yonne department, central France. Its borders were modified at the French canton reorganisation which came into effect in March 2015. Its seat is in Brienon-sur-Armançon.

It consists of the following communes:
 
Arces-Dilo
Bagneaux
Bellechaume
Bœurs-en-Othe
Brienon-sur-Armançon
Cérilly
Cerisiers
Champlost
Les Clérimois
Coulours
Courgenay
Esnon
Flacy
Foissy-sur-Vanne
Fontaine-la-Gaillarde
Fournaudin
Lailly
Malay-le-Petit
Mercy
Molinons
Noé
Paroy-en-Othe
Pont-sur-Vanne
La Postolle
Saint-Maurice-aux-Riches-Hommes
Saligny
Les Sièges
Les Vallées-de-la-Vanne
Vaudeurs
Vaumort
Venizy
Villechétive
Villeneuve-l'Archevêque
Villiers-Louis

References

Cantons of Yonne